Beirdneau Peak is a mountain located in the Bear River Range of northern Utah in the United States. It borders on Mount Logan and forms the walls of both Logan Canyon and Green Canyon.

References

Mountains of Utah